Strageath is a Roman camp near the River Earn in eastern Scotland.  Strageath was one of a chain of camps that the Romans used in their march northward. Other notable camps in this chain are Ardoch, Battledykes, Stracathro, Raedykes and Normandykes.

In the Middle Ages the parish church of Strogeath lay within the area of the fort.  The dedication was to St. Patrick.  The site is marked by a graveyard, and some scant remains of the church building.

Footnotes

Roman fortified camps in Scotland
Scheduled monuments in Scotland
Roman auxiliary forts in Scotland